Rupert George Hickmott (19 March 1894 – 16 September 1916) was a cricketer who played for Canterbury and New Zealand. He died in World War I.

Life and career
Rupert Hickmott was born in Christchurch and educated at Christchurch Boys' High School, where he excelled at cricket, scoring a century in the Heathcote Williams Challenge Shield against Auckland Grammar School, and captaining the First XI for three years. He also captained the rugby XV.

At the start of the senior club season in Christchurch in 1911–12, in his first three innings he scored 112, 96 and 213 not out. He made his first-class debut for Canterbury in December 1911 at the age of 17, scoring 30 and 39 in a low-scoring match to help Canterbury to victory over Wellington. He made 52 and 33 in another victory over Wellington in his next match, which was his first in the Plunket Shield. In 1912-13 he made 77, the top score of the match, when Canterbury beat Otago by an innings to win the Plunket Shield.

He toured Australia with the New Zealand team in 1913-14, where he succeeded in some of the minor matches, but against the state teams he made only 94 runs at an average of 11.75. He was the outstanding batsman in the 1914-15 Plunket Shield, with 307 runs at 51.16, helping Canterbury to victories in all four matches. He top-scored in each innings against Auckland with 56 and 63; made his only century, 109, the top score of the match, against Hawke's Bay; and wound up both Otago innings with 2 for 7 and 4 for 5.

Hickmott enlisted in the New Zealand Expeditionary Force and served as a second lieutenant. He embarked from Wellington in March 1916 on the troopship Willochra. He was killed in action on the Somme in September 1916.

Hickmott's obituary in Wisden said he "was probably the most promising young cricketer in the Dominion, and his early death will be felt severely when the game is resumed". Dan Reese, his captain with both Canterbury and New Zealand, later wrote:

Hickmott ... was a fine all-rounder and to my mind would have become a Warwick Armstrong in New Zealand cricket, for he was a beautiful batsman and bowled "straight" leg-breaks like the great Victorian. His glorious outfielding against Harry Trott's team was a feature of the Canterbury match. His character and temperament made it certain that he would one day have been New Zealand's captain.

References

External links
 Rupert Hickmott at Cricket Archive
 NZ Cricket Museum: Second Lieutenant Hickmott of Christchurch
 Rupert George Hickmott record at Online Cenotaph
 Obituaries 1916, Wisden 1917

1894 births
1916 deaths
New Zealand cricketers
Pre-1930 New Zealand representative cricketers
Canterbury cricketers
New Zealand military personnel killed in World War I
Cricketers from Christchurch
People educated at Christchurch Boys' High School